To Walk Invisible is a British television film about the Brontë family that aired on BBC One on 29 December 2016. The drama was written and directed by Sally Wainwright and focused on the relationship of the three Brontë sisters; Charlotte, Emily and Anne, and their brother, Branwell.

In the United States, it aired on 26 March 2017 on PBS as part of Masterpiece Theater, under the title To Walk Invisible: The Brontë Sisters.

Title
The title of the drama comes from a letter that Charlotte Brontë had written to her publisher about once meeting a clergyman who did not realise that she was Currer Bell. It suited her and her sisters that they were not famous; "What author would be without the advantage of being able to walk invisible?"

Plot
In 1845, the Brontë family, consisting of Patrick Brontë, his daughters Charlotte, Emily and Anne, and his son Branwell, are reunited after Branwell is dismissed from his position as tutor, and Anne, who had been working as a governess for the same family, resigns alongside him. Anne reluctantly tells her sisters that Branwell was dismissed for having had sexual relations with the mistress of the house.

Anne reveals to her sister Charlotte that she still writes, though Charlotte admits to having given up the hobby as it frightens her. Later Anne also confides to Emily that she is terrified by Branwell's drunken behaviour, as their father is blind and sickly and their house belongs to the parish, meaning that when he dies the sisters will be wholly dependent on their brother who is a liar, a heavy drinker, and a spendthrift.

Charlotte, who is also terrified of a future where she is financially dependent on Branwell, has a conversation with him about his future plans where he reveals he has published a few poems, but because of the insignificant amounts paid, is setting his sights on a novel. The conversation triggers Charlotte to wonder if she and her sisters might be able to publish their own material as well. She searches through Emily's room and uncovers her poems, which she finds brilliant and amazing. Emily reacts violently to the breach of privacy, while Anne is intrigued by the idea of publication and shows Charlotte some of her poems and a novel she is working on. Charlotte is unimpressed by Anne's work, but thinks that the three sisters should try to publish a volume of poetry they can use to establish themselves before they write novels. The sisters pay to have Poems by Currer, Ellis, and Acton Bell published and use pseudonyms so as not to be discriminated against because of their sex. They keep the publication secret from their father and brother.

Branwell hears from his mistress and discovers her husband has died. However, his will provides that she will lose both her money and her house if she remarries or is seen with Branwell. Branwell sinks further into alcoholism and becomes increasingly violent.

Meanwhile, the sisters have written novels and begin to send them out for publication. Charlotte takes their father for cataract surgery and during his recovery period she begins work on a second novel, Jane Eyre.

After disappearing for a long time, Branwell returns, severely unwell. The family tries to nurse him back to health but sudden sobriety means that he begins to experience hallucinations.

Charlotte finally receives a letter from a publisher and is disappointed to learn that while Emily's novel Wuthering Heights and Anne's novel Agnes Grey have been accepted for publication, her own novel, The Professor, has been rejected. She urges her sisters to go forward with publication without her and begins to look for a publisher for Jane Eyre.

The situation with Branwell worsens as the family is forced to pay off more of his debts. However, Jane Eyre is accepted for publication and all three of the books are incredibly successful. After yet another incident with Branwell harassing their father for money, Emily urges her sisters to reveal themselves and the huge success of their books to their father in order to alleviate his worries about their financial futures. The sisters ask their father not to reveal their success to Branwell, as they have achieved what he only dreamt of.

Charlotte becomes enraged after Anne and Emily's publisher tries to pass off The Tenant of Wildfell Hall, a book written by Anne, as being Charlotte's work. She insists that the sisters travel to London and reveal themselves to be separate authors. Anne agrees to go with her sister, but Emily refuses, insisting on protecting her anonymity. After Charlotte introduces herself and Anne, they are greeted with great enthusiasm by their publishers, who take them to the opera.

When they return home Emily reveals that Branwell is deeply ill and has been vomiting blood. Branwell never recovers and eventually dies.

A postscript reveals that Emily died three months after Branwell and Anne died five months after her. The parsonage was later turned into a museum celebrating the sisters and their work.

Cast
Finn Atkins as Charlotte Brontë
Charlie Murphy as Anne Brontë
Chloe Pirrie as Emily Brontë
Adam Nagaitis as Branwell Brontë
Jonathan Pryce as Patrick Brontë
Rosie Boore as Young Charlotte
Lara McDonnell as Young Anne
Talia Barnett as Young Emily
Troy Tipple as Young Branwell
James Norton as the Duke of Wellington
Matt Adams as Captain Parry and Jack Sharp
Kris Mochrie as Captain Ross
Jonathan Carley as Napoleon Bonaparte
June Watson as Tabby Aykroyd
Mark Frost as John Brown
Megan Parkinson as Martha Brown
Thomas Nelstrop as Dr John Wheelhouse
Rory Fleck Byrne as Arthur Nicholls
Jamie Dorrington as Enoch Thomas
Gracie Kelly as Ellen Nussey
Thomas Howes as Samuel Hartley
Luke Newberry as George Smith

Production

Writing
BAFTA-winning writer Sally Wainwright, whose other credits include crime drama Happy Valley and comedy-drama Last Tango in Halifax, both set in Yorkshire, said she was "thrilled beyond measure" to have been asked by the BBC to "bring to life these three fascinating, talented, ingenious Yorkshire women".

Filming
The drama was filmed mostly in Yorkshire with Haworth being used extensively during filming. A replica of the Parsonage at Haworth was constructed on the moorland in Penistone Hill Country Park, just west of Haworth. This allowed external scenes to be filmed away from the real Parsonage in the village. The replica parsonage was also added to with other buildings and a street to make a small set of how Haworth looked at the time of the Brontës, with at least one local councillor pointing out that in their time, the Parsonage was not shaded by trees as it is now.

Interior scenes were filmed in studios at Manchester as filming in the actual Parsonage itself was not possible. Other external scenes were filmed within the city of York and the Calder Valley in West Yorkshire.

Critical reception
On review aggregating web site Rotten Tomatoes, the film has achieved a score of 83% based on six reviews, for an average rating of 7.5/10.

Lucy Mangan, writing in The Guardian, described the drama as "bleak, beautiful and brilliant; like everything that Wainwright and her repertory company does". She also praised Nagaitis' performance as "a blazing performance [which] conveys the inner torment as well as the selfishness and keeps our sympathy even as he drives us up the wall".

The Telegraphs Jasper Rees gave the drama five stars out of five describing the episode as "the Brontë sisters brought to fizzing, furious life," and similarly praised Adam Nagaitis' acting, noting that it was excellent.

The programme also attracted numerous comments on social media, with many viewers expressing their displeasure about a fine performance ruined by what they felt to be the poor quality of the film's sound recording.

The characterisation of the Brontë family was criticised by Peggy Hewitt, a member of the Brontë Society whose own biography about the family, These Lonely Mountains, is "widely regarded as the definitive book about the Haworth moors and their links to the Brontës". Hewitt was critical of what she saw as Branwell's character being overplayed, Charlotte's "constant mean pinched look" and the representation of Patrick Brontë as "mild and ineffectual" when she claims he was a "fiery Irishman, Cambridge graduate, [and a] forward-looking social reformer."

References

External links
 
 

2016 television films
2016 drama films
2010s historical drama films
BBC high definition shows
BBC television dramas
British historical drama films
2010s English-language films
Films set in the 1840s
Films set in Yorkshire
Films shot in Yorkshire
Works by Sally Wainwright
British drama television films